"Unglued" is a 1994 promo single from Stone Temple Pilots' second album Purple. It was performed live on the Late Show with David Letterman in December 1994. STP had appeared on Letterman twice before, to perform their songs "Wicked Garden" and "Vasoline", and would appear four more times. The song, like "Vasoline", is known for its highly distorted guitar intro and prominent bass.  "Unglued" was only a minor hit for the band, but can still be heard on radio stations in the United States and remains a staple in their live shows. This is the last song Scott Weiland performed before he died.

Charts

References

1994 singles
Stone Temple Pilots songs
Song recordings produced by Brendan O'Brien (record producer)
1994 songs
Songs written by Scott Weiland
Songs written by Robert DeLeo